Jonah Meyerson (born September 20, 1991) is an American actor and television producer

Early life and education
Meyerson was born in New York City. He is a graduate of Stuyvesant High School, and the University of Pennsylvania as a member of the class of 2013. At UPenn, he was the head writer for and a cast member of Penn's Mask and Wig Club, the nation's oldest collegiate all-male musical comedy troupe. Meyerson also performed with Penn's improv comedy troupe, Without a Net. and was a 2013 member of Penn's Friars Senior Society.

Career
Meyerson made his acting debut in Wes Anderson's 2001 award-winning film The Royal Tenenbaums. He played Uzi, the older son of Chas, played by Ben Stiller, and the grandson of characters played by Gene Hackman and Anjelica Huston. Meyerson was nominated for a Young Artists' award for his work on the film. He starred in Griffin and Phoenix, a Lifetime channel film also released on DVD. His work on that film earned him his second Young Artist Award nomination. In 2005, he was in the films Little Manhattan and The Matador, and in 2004, David Duchovny's House of D. 

Since retiring from acting, Meyerson has become active in television production. During college, Meyerson was an intern for 30 Rock, Saturday Night Live and Onion News Network. He was later a post-production assistant for The Michael J. Fox Show and Unbreakable Kimmy Schmidt. Since 2018, he has worked as an associate producer for The Late Show with Stephen Colbert.

Filmography

Film

Television

References

External links

1991 births
Living people
American male film actors
American male television actors
Stuyvesant High School alumni
Male actors from New York City
21st-century American male actors
University of Pennsylvania alumni